Ryan David Frederick, born  is a former prisoner of the state of Virginia. He was convicted in 2009 of killing an on-duty police officer who was serving a search warrant. Frederick has said he acted in self-defense and did not know that the person breaking into his house was a police officer. Frederick was reportedly released in 2016.

Shooting
On the night of January 17, 2008, Frederick awoke to his dogs barking at an individual breaking into the front door of his Chesapeake, Virginia house; however, the intruder was actually the police. After breaking through the lower part of the door, one officer(unknown to him at the time) crawled half way through the door to try and unlock the deadbolt. Upon seeing the plain clothes Detective, Frederick fired his pistol one time at the person coming through the bottom of the front door, with the bullet striking Detective Jarrod Shivers in the shoulder and passing through it and into a major artery and killing him.

Three days before the police attempted the no knock raid, Frederick's residence had been broken into by a police informant who rifled through the defendant's belongings, reporting to the police that he found Frederick was growing marijuana in his garage and that several marijuana plants, growing lights, irrigation equipment and other gardening supplies had been seen on his property. Based on this information, law enforcement officials secured a warrant to enter Frederick's home. In the course of the trial, Frederick was shown to be an avid gardener who maintained a koi pond and Asian plants in his yard. One of his plants was a Japanese maple tree, which resembles marijuana when its leaves are green. 

After the raid, the police found the gardening supplies and a small amount of marijuana. At the time, in Virginia, simple possession of marijuana was an unclassified misdemeanor, with a maximum penalty of 30 days in jail and a $500 fine for a first offense. The second offense carries a maximum penalty of 12 months in jail and is a Class 1 misdemeanor. (Virginia Law Ref: § 18.2-250.1.) The state since legalized marijuana in 2021. Frederick had no prior criminal record, and was placed by law in the first category.

On February 4, 2009, Frederick was sentenced to 10 years imprisonment following conviction for voluntary manslaughter for the January 17, 2008 shooting death of police officer Jarrod Shivers. The shooting occurred at Frederick's home in Chesapeake, Virginia during the execution of a no knock search warrant police raid serving a warrant to search for a marijuana grow operation. The case is notable for the magnitude of support the defendant received from his community, the press, and blogs, as well as for the relative leniency of the charge the jury chose for conviction in the death of an on-duty police officer.

Frederick was reportedly released in 2016.

According to critics, the Frederick case mirrors another shooting which occurred in New Hanover County, N.C., where college student Peyton Strickland was shot when a police officer participating in a raid on the student's residence mistook the sound of a SWAT battering ram for a gunshot. The officer discharged his weapon several times into the home as Strickland came to answer the door, striking and killing both the student and his dog. The department paid $4.25 million to the parents in restitution, but no charges were filed against the officer.

See also 
 Cory Maye, Mississippi man convicted in death of officer he shot, believing him to be an intruder, during raid on his house.
 Killing of Nathan Heidelberg, Texas police officer fatally shot by homeowner, later acquitted, on front porch; shooter believed officer was a burglar

References 

Place of birth missing (living people)
Year of birth missing (living people)
Living people
Prisoners and detainees of Virginia
American people convicted of manslaughter